The 2023 Southern Conference Men's Basketball Tournament was the postseason men's basketball tournament for the Southern Conference for the 2022–23 season. All tournament games were played at the Harrah's Cherokee Center in Asheville, North Carolina, from March 36, 2023. The winner of the tournament, Furman, received the conference's automatic bid to the 2023 NCAA Division I Men's Basketball Tournament.

Seeds 
All ten teams in the Southern Conference will be eligible to compete in the conference tournament. Teams will be seeded by record within the conference, with a tiebreaker system to seed teams with identical conference records. The top six teams will receive first-round byes.

Schedule and results

Bracket

See also 

 2023 Southern Conference women's basketball tournament

References 

2022–23 Southern Conference men's basketball season
Southern Conference men's basketball tournament
Basketball competitions in Asheville, North Carolina
College sports tournaments in North Carolina
College basketball in North Carolina
2023 in sports in North Carolina
Southern Conference